Events from the year 1626 in Ireland.

Incumbent
Monarch: Charles I

Events
 King Charles I of England, Scotland and Ireland institutes a plantation on the royal estate of Upper Ossory in County Laois.
 Charter of Waterford (revoked in 1618) is restored.

Births
  Willam Dongan, 1st Earl of Limerick

Deaths
 22 September – Hugh MacCaghwell, Franciscan theologian and archbishop (born 1571)
 Date unknown – Niall Garve O'Donnell, last Prince of Tyrconnell (born 1569)

References

 
1620s in Ireland
Ireland
Years of the 17th century in Ireland